Jayden Amari Scrubb (born September 1, 2000) is an American professional basketball player for the Lakeland Magic of the NBA G League. He played college basketball for the John A. Logan Volunteers and was named NABC NJCAA Division I Player of the Year as a sophomore. Scrubb was selected 55th in the 2020 NBA draft.

Early life
Scrubb grew up on the west end of Louisville, Kentucky. He grew up rooting for his hometown team, the Louisville Cardinals. His father described his hometown as "a tougher part of town, which some would consider the hood." Scrubb's family dynamics negatively affected his academics.

High school career
As a freshman, Scrubb attended Central High School in Louisville but was not allowed on the basketball team due to poor academic performance. He sometimes took medications because he believed he had a learning disability. In the summer after failing his freshman year, Scrubb studied to meet the minimum requirements to start his sophomore year. As a sophomore, he transferred from Central to the more esteemed Trinity High School, a prep school in Louisville, on a need-based voucher.

In his first basketball season at Trinity, Scrubb occasionally practiced with the varsity team but never played in games, as he had to sit out due to transfer rules. In his junior year, he enrolled in an alternative academic program at Trinity through which he joined smaller classes and made progress in school. In his junior season, Scrubb averaged 16 points per game and was named Seventh Region Player of the Year by The Courier-Journal. As a senior, he averaged 17.8 points and 7.1 rebounds per game. Scrubb repeated as Seventh Region Player of the Year and was a finalist for the Kentucky Mr. Basketball award.

College career
On April 11, 2018, Scrubb signed to play college basketball for John A. Logan College, a junior college in Carterville, Illinois. He joined a junior college team because he was academically ineligible for an NCAA Division I scholarship, although he had intentions of later transferring to a Division I program. Scrubb made his college debut on November 1, 2018, scoring 12 points in a 106–81 win over Motlow State. On December 8, he scored 25 points and a season-high 20 rebounds in a 99–69 victory over Southeastern Illinois College. Scrubb, on January 16, posted a season-best 40 points and 13 rebounds in a 105–93 win over Rend Lake College. He finished the season averaging 20.2 points, 8.9 rebounds, and 1.6 blocks per game, shooting 46 percent from three-point range. Scrubb was named National Junior College Athletic Association (NJCAA) Region 24 Player of the Year and Great Rivers Athletic Conference (GRAC) Freshman of the Year. He also earned first-team NJCAA Division I All-American honors.

Scrubb parlayed his freshman success at John A. Logan into offers from many NCAA Division I programs, including Louisville, Memphis, and Texas Tech. He was ranked as the number one junior college recruit in his class after his first season. On September 28, 2019, Scrubb committed to play for Louisville following an additional year at John A. Logan. On November 1, 2019, in his sophomore season opener, Scrubb scored 13 points and battled foul trouble in an upset loss to Otero Junior College. On December 6, it was announced that he had been suspended indefinitely after returning to campus late after Thanksgiving break. As a sophomore, Scrubb averaged 21.9 points, 6.8 rebounds and 2.7 assists a game. After the season, he was named the NABC NJCAA Division I Player of the Year and repeated as a first-team NJCAA Division I All-American, while being named GRAC Player of the Year. On March 25, 2020, Scrubb declared for the 2020 NBA draft while maintaining his eligibility and did not immediately sign with an agent. On April 9, he announced that he would sign with an agent and forgo his remaining college basketball eligibility.

Professional career

Los Angeles Clippers (2020–2022)
On November 18, 2020, Scrubb was drafted by the Brooklyn Nets with the 55th overall pick in the 2020 NBA draft. He was subsequently traded to the Los Angeles Clippers. He become the first JUCO player to be drafted since Donta Smith in 2004. On November 23, Scrubb signed a two-way contract with the Clippers.

On February 9, 2022, the Clippers announced that Scrubb would undergo season-ending surgery to repair the plantar plate in his right foot. He was waived on July 27, 2022.

Lakeland Magic (2022–present)
On November 3, 2022, Scrubb was named to the opening night roster for the Lakeland Magic.

Career statistics

NBA

Regular season

|-
| style="text-align:left;"|
| style="text-align:left;"|L.A. Clippers
| 4 || 1 || 21.0 || .389 || .222 || 1.000 || 3.5 || .3 || 1.0 || .0 || 8.8
|-
| style="text-align:left;"|
| style="text-align:left;"|L.A. Clippers
| 18 || 0 || 6.7 || .391 || .286 || .700 || .9 || .4 || .2 || .2 || 2.7
|- class="sortbottom"1
| style="text-align:center;" colspan="2"|Career
| 22 || 1 || 9.3 || .390 || .267 || .800 || 1.4 || .4 || .4 || .1 || 3.8

Playoffs

|-
| style="text-align:left;"|2021
| style="text-align:left;"|L.A. Clippers
| 6 || 0 || 1.3 ||  ||  ||  || .2 || .0 || .0 || .0 || .0
|- class="sortbottom"1
| style="text-align:center;" colspan="2"|Career
| 6 || 0 || 1.3 ||  ||  ||  || .2 || .0 || .0 || .0 || .0

College

|-
| style="text-align:left;"|2018–19
| style="text-align:left;"|John A. Logan
| 30 || 30 ||  || .549 || .464 || .791 || 8.9 || 1.5 || 1.1 || 1.6 || 20.2
|-
| style="text-align:left;"|2019–20
| style="text-align:left;"|John A. Logan
| 29 || 25 ||  || .501 || .333 || .727 || 6.8 || 2.7 || 1.4 || .9 || 21.9
|- class="sortbottom"
| style="text-align:center;" colspan="2"|Career
| 59 || 55 ||  || .524 || .395 || .753 || 7.9 || 2.1 || 1.3 || 1.3 || 21.0

References

External links
John A. Logan Volunteers bio
USA Basketball bio

2000 births
Living people
21st-century African-American sportspeople
African-American basketball players
Agua Caliente Clippers players
American men's basketball players
Basketball players from Louisville, Kentucky
Brooklyn Nets draft picks
John A. Logan Volunteers men's basketball players
Lakeland Magic players
Los Angeles Clippers players
Shooting guards
Small forwards